The 2013–14 Youngstown State Penguins men's basketball team represented Youngstown State University during the 2013–14 NCAA Division I men's basketball season. The Penguins, led by ninth year head coach Jerry Slocum, played their home games at the Beeghly Center and were members of the Horizon League. They finished the season 15–17, 6–10 in Horizon League play to finish in a tie for seventh place. They lost in the first round of the Horizon League tournament to Oakland.

Roster

Schedule

|-
!colspan=9 style="background:#FF0000; color:#FFFFFF;"| Regular season

|-
!colspan=9 style="background:#FF0000; color:#FFFFFF;"| 2014 Horizon League tournament

References

Youngstown State Penguins men's basketball seasons
Youngstown
2013 in sports in Ohio
2014 in sports in Ohio